Phi Upsilon Omicron, sometimes called Phi U, is a scholastic honor society that recognizes academic achievement among students in the field of family and consumer science.

History 
The society was founded at University of Minnesota on February 10, 1909 as the first national student organization in family and consumer sciences.  It was admitted to the Association of College Honor Societies in 1979.

Governance and Structure 
Governing power of the honor society is vested in a Conclave of Delegates from collegiate and alumni chapters. The Conclave meets in even-numbered years, with meetings open to all initiated members including collegiate, alumni, and honorary. The National Council determines each Conclave meeting time and place.

The National Council of Phi Upsilon Omicron, Inc. handles the administration of the honor society in the interim between Conclaves. Members of the National Council include: President, President-Elect, Executive Director, Alumni Councilor, Adviser Councilor, Finance Chair, 4 Region Councilors, the Collegiate Chair and Collegiate Representatives.

The National Council meetings are held annually at a time and place recommended by National Council. In Conclave years it is customary to hold a meeting of National Council just prior to and immediately following the Conclave.

The Executive Board conducts the affairs of the honor society between the meetings of National Council and Conclaves. The Executive Board consists of the National President, National President-Elect, Alumni Councilor, the Region Councilor Chair, the National Collegiate Chair, and the Finance Chair with the Executive Director serving as an ex-officio member.

Phi Upsilon Omicron is supported by a foundation, the Phi Upsilon Omicron Foundation, Inc., which was established in 1970. It provides scholarships and grants to the Fraternity and is governed by a separate board, elected from the general membership.

Phi Upsilon Omicron participates in the Coordinating Council of Family and Consumer Sciences Honor Societies with Kappa Omicron Nu and is an active voting member of the Association of College Honor Societies.

Chapters 
Phi Upsilon Omicron honor society has 61 active chapters across the United States, and a total membership of approximately 97,000.

Traditions 
Phi Upsilon Omicron's colors are white, yellow and purple  White,  Yellow and  Violet. The symbolism of these colors is explained: "The gold is a form of yellow symbolizing light, the cream for the white of honor and integrity, and the violet for the Society's flower, the violet."

Society members receive several recurring publications, including The Candle, a semi-annual official publication.

See also 
 Association of College Honor Societies

References 

Association of College Honor Societies
Honor societies
University of Minnesota
Student organizations established in 1909
1909 establishments in Minnesota
Former members of Professional Fraternity Association